Walnut Hill Community Church is a nondenominational, evangelical megachurch located in Bethel and in three other locations in Connecticut.

History 
The church was founded in 1982 by a group of families that had begun meeting in a home.

In 2017, the weekly church attendance averaged 2,500. It is estimated that more than 4,000 people consider Walnut Hill home. Attendees come from a wide range of denominational and cultural backgrounds, giving the church a reputation for being warm and welcoming.

Multi-campus church 
As a multi-campus church, Walnut Hill Community Church functions as one church with many locations. Each campus location shares the same mission, vision and values, but expresses them in a way that is relevant and effective to its local community. The church communicates its purpose as "Igniting a passion for Jesus in Connecticut, New England and around the world" and invests its resources in providing biblical preaching, serving the local community, developing the next generation and building a strong sense of belonging among its congregation.

Campus locations can be found in Bethel, Derby, New Milford, and Waterbury. Additional campuses will be considered in the future.

Team leadership 
On October 2, 2016, Walnut Hill transitioned from having one senior pastor to a team leadership model where three pastors, Brian Mowrey, Adam DePasquale and Craig Mowrey, serve in partnership as lead pastors, taking on the traditional responsibilities of senior pastor, while continuing to oversee and advance key areas in the life of the church.

Walnut Hill worship 

On June 12, 2011, Walnut Hill Community Church produced a live album entitled, "Revive Us: Songs of Prayer for New England."  Recorded at the Strand Theater in Seymour, the evening was promoted as a live prayer and worship gathering as the church prepared to open its third campus.  The album contains arrangements of hymns that have had influence in New England over the past few hundred years.  Songs include Softly and Tenderly, My Faith Looks Up to Thee, Revive Us Again, I Surrender All and others.

Walnut Hill is continuing to write and release original songs, available on iTunes and Spotify.

Former senior pastors 
 Clive Calver, 2005-2016
 Joel Eidsness, 1992-2005
 Interim Period, 1991-1992
 Doug Muraki, 1987-1991
 Bill Wheat, 1982-1987

References

External links 

Walnut Hill Community Church equipping website
Walnut Hill Community Church media 

Churches in Fairfield County, Connecticut
Churches in Connecticut
Churches in New Haven County, Connecticut
Churches in Litchfield County, Connecticut
Non-denominational Evangelical multisite churches
Evangelical megachurches in the United States
1982 establishments in Connecticut